Pluviatilol is a lignan. It is a Lindera obtusiloba isolate with anti-allergic activity.

References 

Lignans
Benzodioxoles
Methoxy compounds